Zefreh Rural District is a rural district (dehestan) in Kuhpayeh District, Isfahan County, Isfahan Province, Iran. At the 2006 census, its population was 2,048, in 710 families.  The rural district has 18 villages.

References 

Rural Districts of Isfahan Province
Isfahan County